Maricia Titie Ţăran (later Iordache; born 4 January 1962) is a retired Romanian-German rower. Competing for Romania in quadruple sculls she won a gold medal at the 1984 Olympics, followed by two medals at the 1985 and 1986 world championships. After a regatta in Mannheim in 1987, she defected to West Germany, where she competed in single sculls and won a bronze medal at the 1990 World Champsionships.

References 

1962 births
Living people
People from Satu Mare County
Romanian female rowers
German female rowers
Rowers at the 1984 Summer Olympics
Olympic gold medalists for Romania
Olympic medalists in rowing
World Rowing Championships medalists for West Germany
Medalists at the 1984 Summer Olympics